The Mixed 4 x 400 metres relay at the 2017 IAAF World Relays was held at the Thomas Robinson Stadium on 22 April. It was the first time that this event was held at the IAAF World Relays or indeed any senior level major international competition. Each team had to comprise two men and two women but could line them up in any order.

Schedule

Results

Final

References

4 x 400 metres relay
4 × 400 metres relay
Mixed-sex athletics
IAAF World Relays 2017